Solomon Bliss Stebbins (January 18, 1830 – June 8, 1910) was an American politician from Boston.

Early life
Stebbins was born on January 18, 1830, in Warren, Massachusetts. At the age of 18 he was put in charge of the post office in Ludlow, Massachusetts. He moved to Boston in 1850 and in 1858 he and Mitchell F. Andrews established the city's first combined grain elevator and warehouse.

Politics
Stebbins was a member of the Massachusetts House of Representatives in 1861. In 1864 and 1865 he was a member of the Boston Common Council. He was a delegate to the 1864 Republican National Convention. In 1866 he was a member of the Massachusetts Senate. From 1873 to 1879 he was a member of the Boston Board of Aldermen. He was chairman of the board in 1879. Stebbins was the Republican nominee in the 1879 and 1880 Boston mayoral elections. He lost the latter election by 581 votes. He returned to the board of aldermen in 1882 and once again served as chairman. He was one of the commissioners responsible for overseeing the construction of the Suffolk County Courthouse and served as custodian of that building from 1890 until his death on June 8, 1910.

References

1830 births
1910 deaths
Boston Board of Aldermen members
Republican Party Massachusetts state senators
Republican Party members of the Massachusetts House of Representatives
People from Ludlow, Massachusetts
People from Warren, Massachusetts
Politicians from Boston